Adelbert Bryan is a U.S. Virgin Islands politician and former senator.

Political Career 
Adelbert Bryan served as Frederiksted police commander. In 1989, he won 35 percent of the vote for USVI Governor. Bryan has also served as Senator and on the Board of Education.

Personal life 
In 1989, Bryan was charged with looting after Hurricane Hugo.

In 1996, Bryan shot and killed his son, Pell. Law enforcement called the shooting "an act of self-defense" while political rival Alden Alicia Pickering (AKA Alicia Hansen, AKA Chucky) has claimed that it was murder.

In 2001, Bryan's 25-year-old son, Kaunda, was shot and killed in St. Croix.

References 

Year of birth missing (living people)
Living people
Senators of the Legislature of the United States Virgin Islands
United States Virgin Islands police officers